Kurtsuyu can refer to:

 Kurtsuyu, Düzce
 Kurtsuyu, Mut